The 2013 Northern Arizona Lumberjacks football team represented Northern Arizona University in the 2013 NCAA Division I FCS football season. They were led by 16th-year head coach Jerome Souers and played their home games at the Walkup Skydome. They were a member of the Big Sky Conference. They finished the season 9–3, 7–1 in Big Sky play to finish in second place. They were received an at-large bid to the FCS Playoffs where they lost in the first round to South Dakota State.

Schedule

Source: Official Schedule

Despite also being a member of the Big Sky Conference, the game with UC Davis on September 14 is considered a non conference game and will have no effect on the Big Sky Standings.

Ranking movements

References

Northern Arizona
Northern Arizona Lumberjacks football seasons
Northern Arizona
Northern Arizona Lumberjacks football